Ed "Ebby" McHugh (June 9, 1930 – October 2, 2016) was a U.S. soccer player who was a member of the 1952 Summer Olympics.  He also played for St. Louis Simpkins-Ford in the St. Louis Major League.  On October 1, 1996, he was inducted into the St. Louis Soccer Hall of Fame.

References

External links

1930 births
2016 deaths
American soccer players
Olympic soccer players of the United States
Footballers at the 1952 Summer Olympics
St. Louis Simpkins-Ford players
Soccer players from St. Louis
Association football defenders